The Scotland men's national under-18 basketball team is a national basketball team of Scotland, administered by the Basketballscotland. It represents the country in international under-18 basketball competitions.

The team participated at eight FIBA U18 European Championship Division B tournaments. They also won four medals at the FIBA U18 European Championship Division C.

See also
Scotland men's national basketball team
Scotland men's national under-16 basketball team
Scotland women's national under-18 basketball team

References

Basketball in Scotland
Men's national under-18 basketball teams
Basketball